The CIMB Classic was a professional golf tournament in Kuala Lumpur, Malaysia, co-sanctioned by the Asian Tour and the PGA Tour. Played in the fall, the event debuted in 2010 and moved to the West Course of the TPC Kuala Lumpur in 2013; the first three editions were played at The Mines Resort & Golf Club in Mines Wellness City. The event was replaced in the 2019–20 PGA Tour season by the Zozo Championship in Japan.

The tournament was the first event ever sanctioned by the PGA Tour in Southeast Asia. It was an official money event on the Asian Tour, but was an unofficial money event on the PGA Tour through 2012. Beginning in October 2013, it gained official status on the PGA Tour and the field was increased to 78 players. FedEx Cup points are earned by those making the cut, the winner earned a trip to the Masters. The purse was US$7 million, one of the highest in East Asia together with the WGC-HSBC Champions and the now defunct BMW Masters.

Field
In 2010, the 40-man field consisted of the top 25 available players from the PGA Tour's FedEx Cup standings, the top 10 available from the Asian Tour's Order of Merit and 5 sponsors exemptions. In 2011, the field expanded to 48 players, 30 from the FedEx Cup standings, 10 from the Asian Tour's Order of Merit, and 8 sponsors exemptions. In 2013, the field expanded to 78, 60 from the FedEx Cup standings, 10 from the Asian Tour's Order of Merit, and 8 sponsors exemptions.

Winners

Note: Green highlight indicates scoring records.

Notes

References

External links

Coverage on the Asian Tour's official site
Coverage on the PGA Tour's official site

Former Asian Tour events
Former PGA Tour events
Golf tournaments in Malaysia
Recurring sporting events established in 2010
Recurring sporting events disestablished in 2018
2010 establishments in Malaysia
2018 disestablishments in Malaysia